Alfred Russell (25 January 1915 – 27 March 1966) was a British boxer who competed in the 1936 Summer Olympics. He fought as Alf Russell.

Boxing career
In 1936 he competed in the Olympic Games and was eliminated in the first round of the flyweight class after losing his fight to Asbjørn Berg-Hansen.

Russell won the 1938 Amateur Boxing Association British flyweight title, when boxing without the affiliation of a club at the time.

References

External links
 
 Olympic profile
 Boxrec profile

1915 births
1966 deaths
Flyweight boxers
Olympic boxers of Great Britain
Boxers at the 1936 Summer Olympics
British male boxers